This is a list of crime films released in 1996.

References

1996